is a train station located in Sawara-ku. The station's symbol is based on a pen, a pencil, and the letter "N" because the Nishijin area has many schools. The station has the station number "K04".

Lines

Platforms

Vicinity
Department Stores (Daiei, Best Denki, etc.)
Freshness Burger
Fukuoka City Museum
Fukuoka City Central Library
Fukuoka Tower
Nishijin Mall
Seinan Gakuin University
High Schools and Elementary Schools
Shuyukan Senior High School
Fukuoka Memorial Hospital
Yoshimura Hospital

References

Railway stations in Japan opened in 1981
Kūkō Line (Fukuoka City Subway)
Railway stations in Fukuoka Prefecture